Saint Helena, Ascension Island and Tristan da Cunha, as well the other uninhabited islands nearby, are a haven for wildlife in the middle of the Atlantic Ocean. The islands are or were home to much endemic flora and fauna, especially invertebrates, and many endemic fish species found in the reef ecosystems off the islands. The islands have been identified by BirdLife International as Important Bird Areas for both their endemic landbirds and breeding seabirds.

See Ascension scrub and grasslands, Saint Helena scrub and woodlands, and Tristan da Cunha–Gough Islands shrub and grasslands for more details of the World Wildlife Fund-designated ecoregions.

Reptiles 
There are no crocodilians or snakes on the islands. However, many turtles appear around them.

Birds

Saint Helena

Saint Helena is not now a major breeding site for seabirds as Ascension is, but it used to have more endemic birds, all but one of which are now extinct. The wirebird (Charadrius sanctaehelenae) is a type of plover, and is the national bird. It is called the wirebird due to its thin legs that look like wire. Extinct birds on the island include the large Saint Helena petrel, small Saint Helena petrel, Saint Helena crake, Saint Helena swamphen, Saint Helena dove, Saint Helena cuckoo and, most famously, the St. Helena hoopoe.

Ascension
Ascension Island used to be home to many breeding seabirds; most are now all but extinct on the main island, and the main breeding site is on nearby rat-free Boatswain Bird Island. Over 10,000 birds breed on this tiny island, which is home to Ascension frigatebirds, red-footed, brown and masked boobies, red-billed and white-tailed tropicbirds (known as Boatswain birds), and petrels. The sooty tern, known locally as the wideawake tern because of its distinctive call, is the most common breeding seabird on the main island, and the airport is named after it. The Ascension crake and the Ascension night heron, both flightless land birds, are now extinct. The largest native land animal is the land crab Johngarthia lagostoma (formerly Gecarcinus lagostoma).

Tristan da Cunha

Tristan da Cunha has the number of birds on a par with Ascension. Inaccessible Island and Gough Island are together a UNESCO World Heritage Site and a wildlife reserve due to the large number of breeding seabirds found there, including endemics. The birds include the Tristan albatross, Atlantic yellow-nosed albatross, sooty albatross, Atlantic petrel, great-winged petrel, soft-plumaged petrel, grey petrel, broad-billed prion, Tristan skua, brown noddy, northern rockhopper penguin, great shearwater, sooty shearwater, Antarctic tern and Tristan thrush. The Inaccessible Island rail, the world's smallest living flightless bird, is endemic to Inaccessible Island. The Tristan albatross is also native to the islands of Tristan da Cunha, as well as the Atlantic petrel. Gough Island is home to the almost flightless Gough Island moorhen and the critically endangered Gough bunting. The Brown skua is the top predator of the island's ecosystem, feeding on other seabirds as well as land birds such as the Inaccessible Island rail. However, birds of prey such as the barn owl and the Amur falcon are occasional visitors. In 1956, eight Gough moorhens were released at Sandy Point on Tristan, and have subsequently colonized the island. Patrick O'Brian, in the fourth volume of his Aubrey-Maturin series has the ornithologist Fortescue in discussion with Stephen Maturin speak of  an indigenous gallinule  he observed on the island.

Mammals

There are no native land mammals on either  Saint Helena  or  Ascension, only sea mammals such as whales and seals. Over the centuries several introduced mammals have gone feral. On Saint Helena these are cats, dogs, rabbits, rats and mice; donkeys and goats no longer roam free. On Ascension the feral animals still common in parts of the island are donkeys, sheep, rats and mice; the cats have been eliminated.  Goats were introduced to Saint Helena by the Portuguese to provide passing ships with fresh meat.

Tristan da Cunha hosts breeding grounds for subantarctic fur seals and southern elephant seals, several whale species are also found in the waters around Tristan. Cats were eradicated from Tristan da Cunha in 1974. The RSPB is also developing plans for the eradication of house mice from Gough Island.

Terrestrial invertebrates
About 1100 species of land invertebrates have been recorded from Saint Helena, and over 400 of these are endemic and occur nowhere else. Prosperous Bay Plain, the site of the new Saint Helena Airport, is the only site known for about 55 of these endemic species.  The Saint Helena giant earwig is almost certainly extinct, the last chitinous remains having been found in the 1990s. However it is firmly in Saint Helena folklore and hopes linger on.

The central peaks of Saint Helena are home to an extraordinary set of ground beetles of the tribe Bembidiini, which are strikingly morphologically different from bembidiines found elsewhere. They have been found to form a clade of genetically similar species with their sister group being Bembidion alsium from the Indian Ocean island of Réunion. The African subgenus Omotaphus is the sister group to this pair, suggesting that both the Saint Helena and Reunion beetles were derived from single dispersal events from a now-extinct African lineage that was a sister to Omotaphus. All of the Saint Helena bembidiine species are threatened by habitat destruction and invasive species, with some likely to already be extinct.

The only poisonous animal on St Helena is Isometrus maculatus, a scorpion from the family Buthidae.
Restoration plans for Inaccessible Island include investigating the impact and feasibility of eradicating the parasitic wasp Ichneumon insulator.

Marine life
Saint Helena and Ascension Island both have excellent and well preserved coral ecosystems, which are very diverse and contain many endemic and non-endemic fish species.

The following fish are endemic to Ascension Island:
 Resplendent angelfish (Centropyge resplendens)
 Apollo damselfish (Chromis sp.)
 Lubbock's yellowtail damselfish (Stegastes lubbocki)
 Ascension goby (Priolepis ascensionis)
 White hawkfish (Amblycirrhitus earnshawi)
 Marmalade razorfish (Xyrichtys blanchardi)
 Seabream (Diplodus ascensionis)
 Ascension wrasse (Thalassoma ascensionis)

The following are found in both Saint Helena and Ascension Islands;
 Bicolor butterflyfish (Prognathodes dichrous)
 Axillary-spot cardinalfish (Apogon axillaris)
 Parrotfish (Sparisoma strigatum)
 Hogfish Island wrasse (Bodianus insularis)

The following fish are found only on the island of Saint Helena;
 St Helena butterflyfish (Chaetodon sanctaehelenae)
 St Helena flounder (Bothus mellissi)
 St Helena pufferfish (Canthigaster sanctaehelenae)
 St Helena wrasse (Thalassoma sanctaehelenae)

Green turtles make a 3000-mile journey every 3–4 years from Brazil to Ascension Island to breed. They have been a protected species on the island since the mid-20th century and lay their eggs on the unspoilt beaches of the island. The turtles who survive to adulthood will return to breed on the island.

On Tristan da Cunha there is an endemic species of lobster, the Tristan rock lobster, which appears on the coat of arms of the territory. Other marine life includes several temperate water fish species, as well as the seals and whales listed above.

Flora

The Flora of Saint Helena is particularly diverse, with hundreds of endangered endemic species. In recent years there has been a program to conserve and replant the great forest on the island which was destroyed over the years by human activity, causing widespread soil erosion on the island. The Millennium Forest Project has been successful and the forest is expanding rapidly.

There are a few plants endemic to Ascension Island also, these include the Marattia purpurascens, Asplenium ascensionis, Xiphopteris ascensionense, Pteris adscensionis, Euphorbia origanoides & Sporobolus caespitosus. There are several other extinct species. Ascension contains one of the world's largest  artificial forests, planted over the past hundred years with mainly introduced species, on Green Mountain. This has threatened the endemic species on the Island.

The management plan for the Gough and Inaccessible Islands World Heritage Site includes actions to actions to develop and implement an overall biosecurity plan for the islands. This includes steps to manage and eradicate non-native species such as an ongoing programme on Gough Island to eradicate Sagina procumbens. Eradication programs on Gough Island are ongoing and are expected to require years of 'concerted effort'. There is also a programme on Inaccessible Island to eradicate New Zealand Flax and other invasive plants.

Conservation

Saint Helena
Sadly, most of Saint Helena's endemic birds became extinct since human habitation began. Still, Wirebird breeding programs are on-going, although numbers are still falling. The Millennium Forest Project has been highly successful and has boosted the chances of Saint Helena's treasured flora and fauna, and this is the main concentration of conservation on the island.

Important Bird Areas
 North-east Saint Helena Important Bird Area
 South-west Saint Helena Important Bird Area

Ascension
Conservation has been a big issue on Ascension Island, and the Ascension Heritage Society has been set up to help deal with the issues. There have been successful programs for protecting green turtles, and the charity has worked hard with the RSPB to protect the birdlife on the island. The main activities going on at the moment are a cat and rat eradication program, along with attempts to breed the native plant species on the island.

Important Bird Areas
 Ascension Island
 Boatswain Bird Island

Tristan da Cunha
Tristan da Cunha has had some extremely successful programs in conservation, most notably of which is the world heritage site of Inaccessible Island and Gough Island. The low population has helped matters on the islands, as well as the non-existence of cats and other pests.

Important Bird Areas
 Tristan da Cunha
 Inaccessible Island
 Nightingale Islands
 Gough Island

Invasive species
A population of house mice is present on Tristan da Cunha. They are thought to have been accidentally introduced by 19th century seal hunters who would dock on the islands, and have adapted to grow 50% larger in size than mainland house mice. These mice have adapted by consuming sea bird eggs and chicks (as they nest on the ground), killing an estimated 2 million chicks annually.

References

External links and sources
UK Overseas Territories Conservation Forum
The Tristan da Cunha Government official website
Ascension Island Heritage Society
The Official Website of the Royal Society for the Protection of Birds
Ascension Island Administrator official website
Ascension Conservation website
British Geological Survey. (BGS) Ascension website
Ascension Island Volcano Information
Atlantic Green Turtle website
Saint Helena Government official website
Saint Helena Tourist office website
Website with information on all three islands

 01
.
.
.
Saint Helena, Ascension and Tristan da Cunha